Buji is a Local Government Area of Jigawa State, Nigeria. Its headquarters are in the town of Gantsa.
 
It has an area of 548 km and a population of 97,371 at the 2006 census.

The postal code of the area is 721.

References

Local Government Areas in Jigawa State